Big Fish Games is a casual gaming company based in Seattle, with a regional office in Oakland, California, owned by Aristocrat Leisure. It is a developer and distributor of casual games for computers and mobile devices. It has been accused of knowingly deceiving customers into signing up for monthly purchases without informed consent. It was also the subject of a class action lawsuit over its app Big Fish Casino, resulting in a settlement of $155 million after a federal appeals court ruled that it constituted illegal online gambling.

History 
The company was founded in 2002. In 2009, it announced the opening of their European headquarters in Cork, Ireland.

In July 2010, the company passed one billion game downloads from its online portal.

In August 2013, the company announced the closing of its cloud-based games service, Vancouver studio and Cork offices.

In 2014, the company was acquired by Churchill Downs Inc. in a deal valued at up to $885 million.

In 2018, Churchill Downs sold Big Fish to Australian gambling machine manufacturer Aristocrat Leisure for $990 million.

In September 2018, Big Fish cut 15% of its workforce, and September 2020, it cut nearly 50% of its workforce.

Big Fish Studios 
Big Fish Games has a number of studios split between the Seattle office and Oakland office that develop games: Self Aware Games, Triton Studios, Epic Ventures and ARC Studios.

Games developed by the various Big Fish studios include:
Drawn series: Dark Flight, The Painted Tower, Trail of Shadows 
Fairway Solitaire HD  
Hidden Expedition series 
Mystery Case Files series

Online games 
The company entered browser gaming with its acquisition of the game website Ion Thunder in 2007; the service was re-branded as Atlantis following the acquisition. The service, which was later revamped as Big Sea Games in 2009, was shut down in 2010 as part of the company's shift from traditional online games to social games on Facebook and mobile apps.

References

External links 

 

2002 establishments in Washington (state)
American companies established in 2002
Casual games
Companies based in Seattle
Mobile game companies
Video game companies established in 2002
Video game companies of the United States
Video game development companies
2014 mergers and acquisitions
2018 mergers and acquisitions
American subsidiaries of foreign companies